Glipa luteopubens is a species of beetle in the genus Glipa. It was described in 1936.

References

luteopubens
Beetles described in 1936